Driftin' Slim (February 24, 1919 – September 15, 1977) was an American blues singer, guitarist and harmonica player.

Biography
Born Elmon Mickle in Keo, Arkansas, United States, he not only recorded as Driftin' Slim, but also as Model 'T' Slim and under his real name. His recordings were released on the - amongst others - Modern, RPM, Blue Horizon, Styletone, Milestone, Kent, and Flyright record labels.

By the turn of the 1970s, ill health had forced Slim to retire from the music industry and when he died, a chapter of American music — that of the one-man band — had virtually died with him. Slim died from cancer in Los Angeles, California, in September 1977.

Discography

Singles

References

External links
 Illustrated Driftin' Slim / Elmon Mickle discography

1919 births
1977 deaths
American blues guitarists
American male guitarists
American blues harmonica players
American blues singers
Songwriters from Arkansas
Modern Records artists
RPM Records (United States) artists
One-man bands
20th-century American guitarists
Singers from Arkansas
Guitarists from Arkansas
African-American male songwriters
African-American guitarists
20th-century African-American male singers